Blanus aporus is an amphisbaenian species in the family Blanidae. It is found in western Turkey (from Pamphylia and Cilicia in southern Anatolia), Syria, and Lebanon. It was regarded by recent authors as a subspecies of Blanus strauchi.

References 

aporus
Reptiles described in 1898
Taxa named by Franz Werner
Reptiles of Turkey
Reptiles of Syria
Reptiles of the Middle East